Gene Clark was an American singer-songwriter and founding member of the Byrds. His discography consists of 7 studio albums, 3 live albums, 11 compilations, 2 EPs, and 10 singles.

Studio albums
Gene Clark with the Gosdin Brothers (Columbia, February 1967)
White Light aka Gene Clark (A&M, August 1971)
Roadmaster (A&M, January 1973)
No Other (Asylum, September 1974)
Two Sides to Every Story (RSO, February 1977)
Firebyrd (Takoma, November 1984) – reissued in 1995 as This Byrd Has Flown by Edsel Records with additional tracks
So Rebellious a Lover (Rhino, April 1987) – with Carla Olson

As a member of Dillard & Clark
The Fantastic Expedition of Dillard & Clark (A&M, October 1968)
Through the Morning Through the Night (A&M, September 1969)

As a member of McGuinn, Clark & Hillman
McGuinn, Clark & Hillman (Capitol, January 1979)
City (Capitol, January 1980)

Live albums
Silhouetted in Light (recorded February 3, 1990) (Demon, February 1992) – with Carla Olson
In Concert (recorded 1988-1990) (Collectors' Choice Music, August 2007) – with Carla Olson
Silverado '75 - Live & Unreleased (recorded February 19, 1975) (Collectors' Choice Music, April 2008)

Compilations
Collector's Series: Early L.A. Sessions (Columbia, June 1972)
Echoes (Columbia/Legacy, September 1991) – collects Gene Clark with the Gosdin Brothers with additional early material
American Dreamer 1964–1974 (Raven, September 1993) – best of compilation
Flying High (A&M, September 1998) – anthology
Gypsy Angel - The Gene Clark Demos (1983-1990) (Evangeline, October 2001)
Under the Silvery Moon (Delta Deluxe, September 2003) – collection of previously unreleased mid-1980s material
Set You Free: Gene Clark in the Byrds 1964–1973 (Raven, November 2004) – selected recordings with the Byrds
Here Tonight: The White Light Demos (Omnivore Recordings/A&M, March 2013) – selected demos
The Lost Studio Sessions 1964–1982 (Sierra, December 2016) – unreleased recordings
Gene Clark Sings for You (Omnivore Recordings, June 2018) – publishing demos and unreleased tracks recorded with the Rose Garden
Collected (Music on CD/Music on Vinyl, December 2021) – compilation of tracks spanning Clark's entire career

Singles
"Echoes" / "I Found You" (Columbia, December 1966)
"So You Say You Lost Your Baby" / "Is Yours Is Mine" (Columbia, April 1967)
"No Other" / "The True One" (Asylum, January 1975)
"Life's Greatest Fool" / "From a Silver Phial" (Asylum, March 1975)
"Home Run King" / "Lonely Saturday" (RSO, January 1977)
Hugo Montenegro – "Garrote" / Gene Clark – "American Dreamer" (Red Earth split single, 1977)
Gene Clark – "Gypsy Rider" / The Seers – "Flyaway" (Bucketfull of Brains split single, 1988)

Posthumously released
"Only Colombe" / "The French Girl" (Sundazed, May 2008)
"One in a Hundred" / "She's the Kind of Girl" (Sundazed, April 2012)
The Lost Studio Sessions: The Folk Den (Sierra, December 2016) – "All for Him (Or Her)" / "Why Can't I Have Her Back Again"

EPs
Sing 3 Songs by The Byrds (Demon, February 1992) – with Carla Olson – "I'll Feel a Whole Lot Better" / "Set You Free This Time" / "She Don't Care About Time"
The Lost Studio Sessions Bonus Acoustic CD (Sierra, December 2016) – "The Virgin" / "She's the Kind of Girl" / "1975" / "One in a Hundred"
Back Street Mirror - Record Store Day Vinyl EP (Entrée, April 21, 2018) – "Back Street Mirror", "Don't Let It Fall Through", "Yesterday, Am I Right",  "If I Hang Around", "She Told Me", "That's What You Want"

As a member of The Byrds
Mr. Tambourine Man (Columbia, June 1965)
Turn! Turn! Turn! (Columbia, December 1965)
Fifth Dimension (Columbia, July 1966)
Preflyte (Together, July 1969) - compilation of early previously unreleased songs and demos
Byrds (Asylum, March 1973)

Soundtracks
 Marijuana (1968)
Original score
 The American Dreamer (1971)
Two songs contributed: "American Dreamer" and "Outlaw Song"

Tributes
 2000: various artists - Full Circle: A Tribute to Gene Clark (Not Lame)

As composer
 1967: The Barracudas - A Plane View Of The Barracudas (Justice) - track 8, "Feel A Whole Lot Better"
 1968: The Rose Garden - The Rose Garden (ATCO) - track 8, "Till Today" and track 10, "Long Time"
 1969: Santo & Johnny - The Best That Could Happen (Imperial Records) - track 1, "You Showed Me" (co-written with Roger McGuinn)
 1970: Doug  Dillard - The Banjo Album (Together Records) - track 11, "With Care From Someone" (co-written with Doug Dillard and Bernie Leadon)
 1970: Linda Ronstadt - Silk Purse (Capitol) - track 9, "He Darked the Sun" (co-written with Bernie Leadon)
 1971: The Flying Burrito Brothers - The Flying Burrito Bros (album)) (A&M) - track 4, "Tried So Hard"; track 12, "Here Tonight" (CD bonus track)
 1971: Leo Kottke - Mudlark (Capitol) - track 2, "Eight Miles High" (co-written with Roger McGuinn and David Crosby)
 1972: Eagles - Eagles (Asylum) - track 6, "Train Leaves Here This Morning" (co-written with Bernie Leadon)
 1975: Pure Prairie League - Two Lane Highway (RCA Victor) - track 5, "Kansas City Southern"
 1976: Bonnie Raitt - I Thought I Was a Child (Left Field Media) released 2016 - track 6, "Sugar Mama" (co-written with Delbert McClinton)
 1976: Don Nix - Gone Too Long (Cream Records) - track 2, "Feel A Whole Lot Better"
 1977: Dillard / Hartford / Dillard - Glitter Grass From The Nashwood Hollyville Strings (Flying Fish) - track 1, "Don't Come Rollin'" (co-written with Doug Dillard and Bernie Leadon)
 1977: Bobbi Humphrey - Tailor Made (Epic) - track 5, "Jealousy" (co-written with Skip Scarborough)
 1978: Bobby Bare - Sleeper Wherever I Fall (Columbia) - track 8, I'll Feel a Whole Lot Better 1978: Flamin' Groovies - Flamin' Groovies Now (Sire) - track 1, "I'll Feel A Whole Lot Better"
 1980: Roxy Music - Flesh + Blood (Polydor) - track 7, "Eight Miles High" (co-written with Roger McGuinn and David Crosby)
 1981: Mary McCaslin - A Life And Time (Flying Fish) - track 3, "Tender Love And Care" (co-written with Stan Lebowsky)
 1986: This Mortal Coil - Filigree & Shadow (4AD / Warner Bros.) - track 10, "Strength of Strings"
 1989: Tom Petty - Full Moon Fever (MCA) - track 6, Feel A Whole Lot Better 1990: Yo La Tengo - Fakebook (Bar/None) - track 9, "Tried So Hard"
 1991: This Mortal Coil - Blood (4AD) - track 4, "With Tomorrow" (co-written with Jesse Ed Davis)
 1994: Velvet Crush - Teenage Symphonies To God (Epic) - track 3, "Why Not Your Baby"
 1996: The Lightning Seeds - Dizzy Heights (Epic) - track 10, "You Showed Me" (co-written with Roger McGuinn)
 1997: U2 - Pop (Island) - track 9, "The Playboy Mansion" (co-written with Roger McGuinn)
 2000: Western Electric - Western Electric (Munich / Glitterhouse) - track 10, "Straight From The Heart"
 2002: Death In Vegas - Scorpio Rising (Concrete) - track 8, "So You Say You Lost Your Baby"
 2004: Arthur Dodge & The Horsefeathers - Room #4 (Remedy) - track 9, "Why Not Your Baby"
 2007: Robert Plant and Alison Krauss - Raising Sand - track 4, "Polly Come Home"; track 6, "Through The Morning, Through The Night"
 2013: Carla Olson - Have Harmony, Will Travel (Busted Flat) - track 6, "She Don't Care About Time"
 2016: John McEuen - Made in Brooklyn (Chesky) - track 4, "She Darked the Sun" (co-written with Bernie Leadon)

Also appears on
 1973: Roger McGuinn - Roger McGuinn'' (Columbia) - vocals on track 2, "My New Woman"

Sources
Gene Clark biography at Country Music Television
 Gene Clark discography at Byrds Flyght 
 
 
Discographies of American artists
Rock music discographies
Country music discographies
Folk music discographies